S was a streetcar line in Los Angeles, California. It was operated by the Los Angeles Railway from 1895 to 1958, and by the Los Angeles Metropolitan Transit Authority from 1958 to 1963. The route was very popular due to its proximity to Hollywood as well as the sizable manufacturing district in South Los Angeles.

History

San Pedro Line (1895–1911)
The original San Pedro line began at an uncertain point in Downtown Los Angeles and reached the South Side of the city by way of Fourth Street, San Pedro Street, Park Avenue (present-day Avalon Boulevard), Gage Avenue, and South Central Avenue to 68th Street.

S Line (1911–1963)
Following the Great Merger of 1911, the tracks on Fourth Street were removed, and the San Pedro line now ran from San Pedro Street to Seventh Street from Downtown to the outskirts of Westlake. Here, the route took advantage of an old LAIU track on Hoover, Wilshire, and Commonwealth to continue northwest via Sixth Street, Vermont Avenue, Third Street, and Western Avenue to Santa Monica Boulevard on the southern edge of Hollywood. In 1921, the route was given the letter designation "S."

During the LARy and LATL eras, further route changes were made. The LAIU shortcut to Sixth Street was eliminated and the route ran straight on 7th between San Pedro and Vermont, while the route's southern terminus was extended  further south to the intersection of Avalon and Firestone Boulevard. When the N line was decommissioned in 1950, S was re-routed to fill in its route along 8th street.

Operation of the line passed to Los Angeles MTA in 1958. Streetcar service ended on March 31, 1963, by which time the southern terminus had become Central and Manchester Avenue.

Rolling stock
After 1955, PCC streetcars replaced the old rolling stock on the line.

Sources

External links
 S Line Archives — Pacific Electric Railway Historical Society
 

Los Angeles Railway routes
Railway lines opened in 1895
Railway lines closed in 1963
1895 establishments in California
1963 disestablishments in California